Garasangi is a small hamlet in the district of Bijapur of Karnataka state of India. It is adivided by a small stream, so the two sides are called Hire (large/New) Garasangi and Chikk (small/Old) Garasangi.

Villages in Bijapur district, Karnataka